Ambele is a Grassfields language of Cameroon.

References

Grassfields Bantu languages
Languages of Cameroon